The men's sprint event at the 2018 World Singles Ninepin Bowling Classic Championships was held in Cluj-Napoca, Romania on 23 May 2018.

The title of world champion was successfully defended by Serbian Vilmoš Zavarko, who defeated German Axel Schondelmaier in the final. Bronze medals went to semi-finalists Italian Wolfgang Blass and representative of the hosts - Romanian Nicolae Lupu.

Results

Starting places 

The starting places have been allocated on the basis of each team's achievements during the previous championships.

Draw 

The players were drawn into pairs with the reservation that competitors from the same country can not play in the first round against each other.

References 

2018
Men's sprint